Robert Smith (born 12 June 1961) is a British equestrian. He was born in Yorkshire,  a son of Harvey Smith, and brother of Steven Smith, and lives in Shrewley, Warwickshire. He competed in show jumping at the 2004 Summer Olympics in Athens, and placed fourth in the individual contest.

References

1961 births
Living people
British male equestrians
Olympic equestrians of Great Britain
Equestrians at the 2004 Summer Olympics